Ed Trimmer (born January 12, 1952) was a Democratic member of the Kansas House of Representatives, representing the 79th district and had been the minority whip. He served from August 19, 2005 until January 14, 2019.

Trimmer was defeated for reelection by Republican Cheryl Helmer, who received 3,683 votes, 50.8% of the total ballots cast, to Trimmer's 3,570 votes 49.2% of the total.

In 2019, Trimmer was elected to the Winfield Board of Education, receiving the highest total of the four seated candidates who were running for four-year terms.

Trimmer taught in Winfield Public Schools from 1974–2006.

He has served on a number of organizations including Mosaic Patient Review Committee, ABCDE,  National Forensic League, Vision 20/20 People Sub-committee, and the Kansas Speech Communication Association.

Committee membership
 Education
 Health and Human Services
 Government Efficiency and Fiscal Oversight (Ranking Member)
 Joint Committee on Administrative Rules and Regulations

Major Donors
The top 5 donors to Trimmer's 2008 campaign were all professional organizations:
1. Kansas Medical Society 	$1,000
2. Kansas Contractors Assoc 	$1,000
3. Kansas National Education Assoc 	$1,000
4. Kansas Assoc of Realtors 	$900 	
5. Kansas Optometric Assoc 	$750

References

External links
 Kansas Legislature - Ed Trimmer
 Project Vote Smart profile
 Kansas Votes profile
 State Surge - Legislative and voting track record
 Campaign contributions: 2006, 2008

Democratic Party members of the Kansas House of Representatives
Living people
1952 births
21st-century American politicians
Emporia State University alumni